The men's 400 metres hurdles at the 1954 European Athletics Championships was held in Bern, Switzerland, at Stadion Neufeld on 26, 28, and 29 August 1954.

Medalists

Results

Final
29 August

Semi-finals
28 August

Semi-final 1

Semi-final 2

Heats
26 August

Heat 1

Heat 2

Heat 3

Heat 4

Heat 5

Heat 6

Participation
According to an unofficial count, 24 athletes from 15 countries participated in the event.

 (2)
 (1)
 (1)
 (2)
 (1)
 (2)
 (1)
 (2)
 (2)
 (1)
 (2)
 (2)
 (1)
 (2)
 (2)

References

400 metres hurdles
400 metres hurdles at the European Athletics Championships